Jasef Alexandrovich Serebriany (April 25, 1907, Horodnia, Chernigov Governorate – 1979, Leningrad) was a Soviet Russian painter and stage decorator, who lived and worked in Leningrad, a member of the Leningrad Union of Artists, People's Artist of the Russian Federation, professor of the Repin Institute of Arts, regarded as one of the leading representatives of the Leningrad school of painting, well known for his portrait paintings.

Biography 

In 1924-1927 studied in Tavricheskaya Art School in Leningrad. In 1927-1931 studied in Repin Institute of Arts, student of Mikhail Bobyshov, Arcady Rylov, Vasili Savinsky. Take place in Art Exhibitions since 1925. In 1931-1934 he worked as designer and stage decorator. In 1935–1941 years he painted mainly by the order in portrait and historical genre. In 1941-1945 during the Great Patriotic war and the blockade remained in Leningrad.

In 1947 Jasef Serebriany was elected a corresponding member of the Academy of Arts of the USSR. In 1948-1979 he taught in the Repin Institute of Arts as a professor of painting and a head of personal workshop. In 1965 Jasef Serebriany was awarded an honorable title of People's Artist of the Russian Federation, in 1977 of the People's Artist of the USSR. Twice he was elected chairman of the Leningrad Union of Artists (1948–1952 and 1954–1958). In 1966 he was awarded the Silver Medal of the Academy of Fine Arts of the USSR for a portrait of Dmitry Shostakovich. His works reside in the State Russian Museum, Tretyakov Gallery, in many museums and private collections in Russia, France, Ukraine, Germany, and other countries.

See also
 Leningrad School of Painting
 List of 20th-century Russian painters
 List of painters of Saint Petersburg Union of Artists
 Saint Petersburg Union of Artists

References

Sources 
 Бойков В. Изобразительное искусство Ленинграда. Заметки о выставке ленинградских художников // Ленинградская правда, 1947, 29 ноября.
 Выставка произведений ленинградских художников 1951 года. Каталог. М-Л., Искусство, 1951. C.22.
 Двести лет Академии художеств СССР. Каталог выставки. Л-М., Искусство, 1958. C.236-237.
 Выставка произведений ленинградских художников 1960 года. Каталог. Л., Художник РСФСР, 1961. C.38.
 Республиканская художественная выставка «Советская Россия». Каталог. М., Советский художник, 1960. C.75.
 Бетхер-Остренко И. Художественная летопись истории // Вечерний Ленинград, 1964, 28 января.
 Ленинград. Зональная выставка. Л., Художник РСФСР, 1965. С.49.
 Аникушин М. Солнце на полотнах // Ленинградская правда, 1964, 3 ноября.
 Буткевич О. От находок к открытиям. Заметки с выставки «Ленинград» // Советская культура, 1964, 26 декабря.
 Колесова О. Две тысячи встреч. На выставке «Ленинград» // Ленинградская правда, 1964, 4 ноября.
 Вторая республиканская художественная выставка «Советская Россия». Каталог. М., Советский художник, 1965. С.36.
 Колесова О. Широка страна моя ... Творческий отчёт ленинградских художников, посвящённый 50-летию образования СССР // Ленинградская правда, 1972, 23 сентября.
 Богданов А. Славя страну труда Вечерний Ленинград, 1972, 10 октября.
 Богданов А. Ярче, но и глубже // Вечерний Ленинград, 1973, 25 декабря.
 Яковлева Л. Величие подвига // Вечерний Ленинград, 1975, 27 мая.
 И. Мямлин. Сердце с правдой вдвоём… / Ленинградская правда, 1975, 1 июня.
 Изобразительное искусство Ленинграда. Каталог выставки. Л., Художник РСФСР, 1976. C.30.
 Справочник членов Союза художников СССР. Т.2 М., Советский художник, 1979. C.337.
 Справочник членов Ленинградской организации Союза художников РСФСР. Л., Художник РСФСР, 1972. C.49.
 Matthew Cullerne Bown. A Dictionary of Twentieth Century Russian And Soviet Painters. 1900 — 1980s. London. Izomar Limited, 1998.
 Юбилейный Справочник выпускников Санкт-Петербургского академического института живописи, скульптуры и архитектуры имени И. Е. Репина Российской Академии художеств. 1915—2005. СПб., Первоцвет, 2007. С.35.
 Государственный Русский музей. Живопись первой половины ХХ века (К) // Альманах. Вып.226. СПб., Palace Edition, 2008. С.15.

1907 births
1979 deaths
People from Chernihiv Oblast
People from Chernigov Governorate
People's Artists of the USSR (visual arts)
Soviet painters
Members of the Leningrad Union of Artists
Socialist realist artists
Leningrad School artists
Russian portrait painters
Burials at Serafimovskoe Cemetery
20th-century Russian male artists